Mamatayevo (Mämätäy) is a rural locality (a village) in Bul-Kaypanovsky Selsoviet, Tatyshlinsky District, Bashkortostan, Russia. The population was 313 as of 2010. There are 5 streets.

Geography 
Mamatayevo is located 13 km northwest of Verkhniye Tatyshly (the district's administrative centre) by road. Starochukurovo is the nearest rural locality.

References 

Rural localities in Tatyshlinsky District